The Cayman Baptist Association is a fellowship of Baptist churches on Cayman Brac.

Baptist work began in the Cayman Islands in 1885, when J. H. Sobey of the Jamaica Baptist Mission Society visited the islands. Four churches were organised on Cayman Brac and one on Little Cayman.

Notes

References

Baptist denominations in the Caribbean
Christianity in the Cayman Islands
Religious organizations established in 1885
Religious organisations based in the Cayman Islands
1885 establishments in the British Empire